The 1941 Pittsburgh Pirates was a season in American baseball. The team finished fourth in the National League with a record of 81–73, 19 games behind the first-place Brooklyn Dodgers.

Regular season

Season standings

Record vs. opponents

Game log

|- bgcolor="ffbbbb"
| 1 || April 15 || @ Cubs || 4–7 || Passeau || Klinger (0–1) || — || 17,008 || 0–1
|- bgcolor="ccffcc"
| 2 || April 17 || @ Cubs || 7–2 || Sewell (1–0) || Olsen || — || 4,109 || 1–1
|- bgcolor="ccffcc"
| 3 || April 18 || Reds || 4–1 || Butcher (1–0) || Walters || — || 18,644 || 2–1
|- bgcolor="ffbbbb"
| 4 || April 19 || Reds || 3–5 || Derringer || Bauers (0–1) || — || 10,465 || 2–2
|- bgcolor="ffbbbb"
| 5 || April 20 || Reds || 3–7 || Turner || Bowman (0–1) || Thompson || 19,060 || 2–3
|- bgcolor="ffbbbb"
| 6 || April 22 || @ Cardinals || 8–9 (12) || Grodzicki || Heintzelman (0–1) || — || 1,776 || 2–4
|- bgcolor="ffbbbb"
| 7 || April 23 || @ Cardinals || 1–3 || Nahem || Butcher (1–1) || — || 1,875 || 2–5
|- bgcolor="ccffcc"
| 8 || April 24 || Cubs || 2–1 (11) || Lanning (1–0) || French || — || 1,959 || 3–5
|- bgcolor="ffbbbb"
| 9 || April 25 || Cubs || 7–8 || Page || Heintzelman (0–2) || — || 3,902 || 3–6
|- bgcolor="ffbbbb"
| 10 || April 26 || @ Reds || 3–10 || Vander Meer || Bauers (0–2) || — || 8,112 || 3–7
|- bgcolor="ffbbbb"
| 11 || April 27 || @ Reds || 2–3 || Walters || Sewell (1–1) || — || 19,114 || 3–8
|- bgcolor="ffbbbb"
| 12 || April 29 || @ Phillies || 2–6 || Crouch || Butcher (1–2) || — || 800 || 3–9
|- bgcolor="ffbbbb"
| 13 || April 30 || @ Phillies || 4–8 || Blanton || Lanahan (0–1) || — || 3,385 || 3–10
|-

|- bgcolor="ccffcc"
| 14 || May 1 || @ Phillies || 15–2 || Bauers (1–2) || Johnson || — || 1,500 || 4–10
|- bgcolor="ffffff"
| 15 || May 2 || @ Giants || 7–7 (13) ||  ||  || — || 3,268 || 4–10
|- bgcolor="ccffcc"
| 16 || May 3 || @ Giants || 3–2 || Butcher (2–2) || Bowman || — || 7,417 || 5–10
|- bgcolor="ccffcc"
| 17 || May 4 || @ Dodgers || 6–4 || Heintzelman (1–2) || Hamlin || — || 27,015 || 6–10
|- bgcolor="ffbbbb"
| 18 || May 6 || @ Dodgers || 3–7 || Wyatt || Sewell (1–2) || — || 7,443 || 6–11
|- bgcolor="ffbbbb"
| 19 || May 7 || @ Braves || 6–7 || Tobin || Lanning (1–1) || — || 2,458 || 6–12
|- bgcolor="ffbbbb"
| 20 || May 11 || Cardinals || 4–7 || Nahem || Butcher (2–3) || Hutchinson || 12,388 || 6–13
|- bgcolor="ffbbbb"
| 21 || May 12 || Cardinals || 2–6 || Warneke || Heintzelman (1–3) || — || — || 6–14
|- bgcolor="ccffcc"
| 22 || May 13 || Phillies || 6–3 || Sewell (2–2) || Grissom || — || 986 || 7–14
|- bgcolor="ccffcc"
| 23 || May 14 || Phillies || 12–7 || Klinger (1–1) || Bruner || — || 1,254 || 8–14
|- bgcolor="ccffcc"
| 24 || May 16 || Dodgers || 3–2 (11) || Bowman (1–1) || Brown || — || 3,984 || 9–14
|- bgcolor="ffbbbb"
| 25 || May 18 || Giants || 4–5 || Adams || Sewell (2–3) || Brown || 13,659 || 9–15
|- bgcolor="ccffcc"
| 26 || May 19 || Giants || 2–1 || Butcher (3–3) || Hubbell || — || 2,574 || 10–15
|- bgcolor="ccffcc"
| 27 || May 20 || Giants || 7–5 || Klinger (2–1) || Schumacher || — || 3,050 || 11–15
|- bgcolor="ccffcc"
| 28 || May 21 || Braves || 8–4 || Wilkie (1–0) || Tobin || — || 2,311 || 12–15
|- bgcolor="ffbbbb"
| 29 || May 23 || @ Cardinals || 1–2 || Cooper || Butcher (3–4) || — || 18,555 || 12–16
|- bgcolor="ffbbbb"
| 30 || May 24 || @ Cardinals || 7–10 || Nahem || Sewell (2–4) || Lanier || 2,952 || 12–17
|- bgcolor="ffbbbb"
| 31 || May 25 || @ Cardinals || 4–6 || Gumbert || Wilkie (1–1) || White || — || 12–18
|- bgcolor="ffbbbb"
| 32 || May 25 || @ Cardinals || 3–4 || Krist || Klinger (2–2) || Lanier || 18,749 || 12–19
|- bgcolor="ffbbbb"
| 33 || May 26 || @ Reds || 3–7 || Walters || Strincevich (0–1) || — || 20,567 || 12–20
|- bgcolor="ccffcc"
| 34 || May 28 || @ Reds || 7–4 || Butcher (4–4) || Moore || — || 2,560 || 13–20
|- bgcolor="ffbbbb"
| 35 || May 30 || Cubs || 6–7 || Lee || Sewell (2–5) || — || — || 13–21
|- bgcolor="ccffcc"
| 36 || May 30 || Cubs || 5–4 || Sewell (3–5) || Passeau || — || 17,297 || 14–21
|-

|- bgcolor="ffbbbb"
| 37 || June 2 || @ Braves || 0–2 || Errickson || Lanning (1–2) || — || 1,034 || 14–22
|- bgcolor="ccffcc"
| 38 || June 3 || @ Braves || 9–5 || Heintzelman (2–3) || LaManna || Bowman (1) || 1,776 || 15–22
|- bgcolor="ccffcc"
| 39 || June 6 || @ Giants || 5–4 || Butcher (5–4) || McGee || — || — || 16–22
|- bgcolor="ccffcc"
| 40 || June 6 || @ Giants || 4–3 || Sewell (4–5) || Lohrman || — || 8,324 || 17–22
|- bgcolor="ffbbbb"
| 41 || June 7 || @ Phillies || 0–2 || Blanton || Lanning (1–3) || — || 3,802 || 17–23
|- bgcolor="ccffcc"
| 42 || June 8 || @ Phillies || 12–2 || Bowman (2–1) || Hughes || Sewell (1) || — || 18–23
|- bgcolor="ffbbbb"
| 43 || June 8 || @ Phillies || 2–5 || Podgajny || Bauers (1–3) || — || — || 18–24
|- bgcolor="ccffcc"
| 44 || June 9 || @ Phillies || 5–0 || Wilkie (2–1) || Grissom || — || 892 || 19–24
|- bgcolor="ffbbbb"
| 45 || June 10 || @ Dodgers || 3–4 || Fitzsimmons || Heintzelman (2–4) || — || 6,426 || 19–25
|- bgcolor="ccffcc"
| 46 || June 11 || @ Dodgers || 8–1 || Sewell (5–5) || Higbe || — || 30,469 || 20–25
|- bgcolor="ccffcc"
| 47 || June 14 || Braves || 8–2 || Butcher (6–4) || Salvo || — || 2,908 || 21–25
|- bgcolor="ffbbbb"
| 48 || June 15 || Braves || 1–5 || Posedel || Wilkie (2–2) || — || 12,562 || 21–26
|- bgcolor="ffbbbb"
| 49 || June 17 || Giants || 3–6 || Hubbell || Sewell (5–6) || — || 1,586 || 21–27
|- bgcolor="ffffff"
| 50 || June 18 || Giants || 2–2 (11) ||  ||  || — || 24,738 || 21–27
|- bgcolor="ffbbbb"
| 51 || June 19 || Giants || 6–9 || Brown || Heintzelman (2–5) || — || 2,127 || 21–28
|- bgcolor="ccffcc"
| 52 || June 20 || Phillies || 7–6 || Dietz (1–0) || Pearson || — || 1,046 || 22–28
|- bgcolor="ccffcc"
| 53 || June 21 || Phillies || 2–0 || Bowman (3–1) || Grissom || — || 2,321 || 23–28
|- bgcolor="ccffcc"
| 54 || June 22 || Phillies || 4–1 || Sewell (6–6) || Blanton || — || — || 24–28
|- bgcolor="ffbbbb"
| 55 || June 22 || Phillies || 4–7 || Hughes || Butcher (6–5) || Johnson || 10,060 || 24–29
|- bgcolor="ffbbbb"
| 56 || June 23 || Dodgers || 4–9 || Fitzsimmons || Klinger (2–3) || Brown || 2,335 || 24–30
|- bgcolor="ffbbbb"
| 57 || June 24 || Dodgers || 0–8 || Davis || Lanning (1–4) || — || 20,537 || 24–31
|- bgcolor="ffbbbb"
| 58 || June 25 || Dodgers || 4–5 || Higbe || Heintzelman (2–6) || — || 2,425 || 24–32
|- bgcolor="ccffcc"
| 59 || June 27 || @ Cubs || 4–2 || Sewell (7–6) || Passeau || — || 4,622 || 25–32
|- bgcolor="ffbbbb"
| 60 || June 28 || @ Cubs || 2–3 || Olsen || Butcher (6–6) || — || 3,654 || 25–33
|- bgcolor="ccffcc"
| 61 || June 29 || @ Cubs || 8–2 || Lanning (2–4) || French || — || — || 26–33
|- bgcolor="ccffcc"
| 62 || June 29 || @ Cubs || 3–2 || Sullivan (1–0) || Lee || Sewell (2) || 17,440 || 27–33
|- bgcolor="ccffcc"
| 63 || June 30 || Cardinals || 4–3 || Heintzelman (3–6) || Gumbert || — || 16,306 || 28–33
|-

|- bgcolor="ffbbbb"
| 64 || July 1 || Cardinals || 7–11 || Warneke || Sewell (7–7) || — || — || 28–34
|- bgcolor="ccffcc"
| 65 || July 2 || Reds || 8–3 || Butcher (7–6) || Derringer || — || 1,941 || 29–34
|- bgcolor="ffbbbb"
| 66 || July 4 || @ Reds || 0–6 || Walters || Lanning (2–5) || — || — || 29–35
|- bgcolor="ccffcc"
| 67 || July 4 || @ Reds || 6–4 || Heintzelman (4–6) || Pearson || — || 14,391 || 30–35
|- bgcolor="ccffcc"
| 68 || July 5 || Cubs || 9–6 || Sullivan (2–0) || Lee || Klinger (1) || 4,571 || 31–35
|- bgcolor="ccffcc"
| 69 || July 6 || Cubs || 2–1 || Sewell (8–7) || Passeau || — || — || 32–35
|- bgcolor="ccffcc"
| 70 || July 6 || Cubs || 13–4 (8) || Butcher (8–6) || Root || Lanning (1) || 14,306 || 33–35
|- bgcolor="ccffcc"
| 71 || July 10 || @ Phillies || 6–3 || Sewell (9–7) || Hughes || Sullivan (1) || — || 34–35
|- bgcolor="ccffcc"
| 72 || July 12 || @ Phillies || 6–1 || Lanning (3–5) || Podgajny || — || 1,500 || 35–35
|- bgcolor="ccffcc"
| 73 || July 13 || @ Giants || 4–0 || Heintzelman (5–6) || Lohrman || — || — || 36–35
|- bgcolor="ffbbbb"
| 74 || July 13 || @ Giants || 2–8 || Schumacher || Butcher (8–7) || — || 22,865 || 36–36
|- bgcolor="ffbbbb"
| 75 || July 14 || @ Giants || 2–3 || Hubbell || Sewell (9–8) || — || 3,125 || 36–37
|- bgcolor="ccffcc"
| 76 || July 15 || @ Giants || 5–1 || Butcher (9–7) || Melton || — || 3,296 || 37–37
|- bgcolor="ffbbbb"
| 77 || July 16 || @ Braves || 1–4 || Tobin || Lanning (3–6) || — || — || 37–38
|- bgcolor="ccffcc"
| 78 || July 16 || @ Braves || 13–5 || Dietz (2–0) || Hutchings || Wilkie (1) || 3,278 || 38–38
|- bgcolor="ccffcc"
| 79 || July 18 || @ Braves || 5–1 || Heintzelman (6–6) || Johnson || — || — || 39–38
|- bgcolor="ffbbbb"
| 80 || July 18 || @ Braves || 3–4 || LaManna || Wilkie (2–3) || — || 3,315 || 39–39
|- bgcolor="ffbbbb"
| 81 || July 20 || @ Dodgers || 1–5 || Davis || Sewell (9–9) || — || — || 39–40
|- bgcolor="ccffcc"
| 82 || July 20 || @ Dodgers || 5–1 || Lanning (4–6) || Wyatt || — || — || 40–40
|- bgcolor="ccffcc"
| 83 || July 21 || @ Dodgers || 8–3 || Heintzelman (7–6) || Kimball || — || — || 41–40
|- bgcolor="ccffcc"
| 84 || July 22 || Phillies || 4–3 || Klinger (3–3) || Podgajny || — || 1,730 || 42–40
|- bgcolor="ccffcc"
| 85 || July 23 || Phillies || 5–2 || Butcher (10–7) || Blanton || — || 13,109 || 43–40
|- bgcolor="ccffcc"
| 86 || July 24 || Phillies || 3–2 || Klinger (4–3) || Grissom || — || 1,326 || 44–40
|- bgcolor="ccffcc"
| 87 || July 25 || Dodgers || 8–4 || Sullivan (3–0) || Wyatt || — || — || 45–40
|- bgcolor="ccffcc"
| 88 || July 25 || Dodgers || 8–2 || Lanning (5–6) || Davis || — || — || 46–40
|- bgcolor="ffbbbb"
| 89 || July 26 || Dodgers || 2–3 || Hamlin || Heintzelman (7–7) || Higbe || 7,009 || 46–41
|- bgcolor="ccffcc"
| 90 || July 27 || Dodgers || 4–3 || Klinger (5–3) || Davis || — || — || 47–41
|- bgcolor="ccffcc"
| 91 || July 27 || Dodgers || 8–0 (8) || Sewell (10–9) || Casey || — || 40,093 || 48–41
|- bgcolor="ccffcc"
| 92 || July 29 || Braves || 5–3 (8) || Sullivan (4–0) || Javery || Klinger (2) || 4,860 || 49–41
|- bgcolor="ffbbbb"
| 93 || July 30 || Braves || 2–3 (10) || Tobin || Bowman (3–2) || — || 11,362 || 49–42
|- bgcolor="ccffcc"
| 94 || July 31 || Braves || 9–8 || Lanning (6–6) || Errickson || Dietz (1) || 1,870 || 50–42
|-

|- bgcolor="ccffcc"
| 95 || August 1 || Giants || 6–3 || Butcher (11–7) || Hubbell || — || 4,324 || 51–42
|- bgcolor="ffbbbb"
| 96 || August 2 || Giants || 0–2 (10) || Schumacher || Sewell (10–10) || — || 5,550 || 51–43
|- bgcolor="ccffcc"
| 97 || August 3 || Giants || 5–4 || Dietz (3–0) || McGee || — || — || 52–43
|- bgcolor="ccffcc"
| 98 || August 3 || Giants || 10–4 (6) || Klinger (6–3) || Wittig || — || 25,688 || 53–43
|- bgcolor="ccffcc"
| 99 || August 4 || @ Reds || 4–1 || Lanning (7–6) || Thompson || — || 2,109 || 54–43
|- bgcolor="ccffcc"
| 100 || August 5 || @ Reds || 7–5 || Butcher (12–7) || Turner || Klinger (3) || 2,390 || 55–43
|- bgcolor="ccffcc"
| 101 || August 6 || @ Cubs || 13–3 || Sewell (11–10) || Pressnell || — || 5,574 || 56–43
|- bgcolor="ccffcc"
| 102 || August 7 || @ Cubs || 4–3 || Dietz (4–0) || Mooty || — || 5,035 || 57–43
|- bgcolor="ffbbbb"
| 103 || August 8 || @ Cubs || 0–1 || Erickson || Lanning (7–7) || — || 5,846 || 57–44
|- bgcolor="ccffcc"
| 104 || August 9 || @ Cardinals || 5–4 (13) || Klinger (7–3) || Hutchinson || — || 5,223 || 58–44
|- bgcolor="ffbbbb"
| 105 || August 10 || @ Cardinals || 2–3 || White || Sewell (11–11) || Crouch || — || 58–45
|- bgcolor="ffbbbb"
| 106 || August 10 || @ Cardinals || 2–4 || Cooper || Heintzelman (7–8) || — || 26,513 || 58–46
|- bgcolor="ffbbbb"
| 107 || August 13 || Cubs || 4–6 || Eaves || Lanning (7–8) || Mooty || 24,373 || 58–47
|- bgcolor="ffbbbb"
| 108 || August 14 || Cubs || 2–6 || Passeau || Butcher (12–8) || — || 3,032 || 58–48
|- bgcolor="ccffcc"
| 109 || August 16 || Cardinals || 4–2 || Heintzelman (8–8) || White || — || — || 59–48
|- bgcolor="ffbbbb"
| 110 || August 17 || Cardinals || 1–7 || Cooper || Butcher (12–9) || — || — || 59–49
|- bgcolor="ccffcc"
| 111 || August 17 || Cardinals || 8–2 || Sewell (12–11) || Warneke || — || 34,292 || 60–49
|- bgcolor="ffbbbb"
| 112 || August 18 || @ Dodgers || 5–6 || Casey || Butcher (12–10) || — || 9,832 || 60–50
|- bgcolor="ffbbbb"
| 113 || August 19 || @ Dodgers || 0–9 || Davis || Sullivan (4–1) || — || — || 60–51
|- bgcolor="ffbbbb"
| 114 || August 19 || @ Dodgers || 2–6 || Drake || Heintzelman (8–9) || Casey || 9,372 || 60–52
|- bgcolor="ffbbbb"
| 115 || August 20 || @ Dodgers || 6–7 || Allen || Sewell (12–12) || — || 14,752 || 60–53
|- bgcolor="ccffcc"
| 116 || August 21 || @ Giants || 5–3 || Butcher (13–10) || McGee || — || 11,845 || 61–53
|- bgcolor="ccffcc"
| 117 || August 22 || @ Giants || 5–3 || Lanning (8–8) || Bowman || — || 2,439 || 62–53
|- bgcolor="ffbbbb"
| 118 || August 23 || @ Giants || 3–5 || Schumacher || Dietz (4–1) || — || — || 62–54
|- bgcolor="ccffcc"
| 119 || August 23 || @ Giants || 4–3 || Klinger (8–3) || Brown || — || — || 63–54
|- bgcolor="ffbbbb"
| 120 || August 24 || @ Braves || 3–4 (12) || Salvo || Sewell (12–13) || — || — || 63–55
|- bgcolor="ccffcc"
| 121 || August 24 || @ Braves || 7–3 (6) || Klinger (9–3) || Javery || — || 13,411 || 64–55
|- bgcolor="ffbbbb"
| 122 || August 26 || @ Braves || 3–4 || Tobin || Wilkie (2–4) || — || — || 64–56
|- bgcolor="ccffcc"
| 123 || August 26 || @ Braves || 6–1 || Butcher (14–10) || Errickson || — || 3,527 || 65–56
|- bgcolor="ccffcc"
| 124 || August 27 || @ Phillies || 12–2 || Lanning (9–8) || Blanton || — || 1,748 || 66–56
|- bgcolor="ccffcc"
| 125 || August 28 || @ Phillies || 3–2 || Dietz (5–1) || Pearson || Klinger (4) || 5,500 || 67–56
|- bgcolor="ffbbbb"
| 126 || August 30 || @ Cubs || 1–4 || Erickson || Sewell (12–14) || — || 6,777 || 67–57
|- bgcolor="ccffcc"
| 127 || August 31 || @ Cubs || 4–3 || Butcher (15–10) || Passeau || — || — || 68–57
|-

|- bgcolor="ffbbbb"
| 128 || September 1 || @ Cardinals || 3–5 || White || Heintzelman (8–10) || — || — || 68–58
|- bgcolor="ffbbbb"
| 129 || September 1 || @ Cardinals || 3–6 (8) || Pollet || Klinger (9–4) || — || 34,812 || 68–59
|- bgcolor="ccffcc"
| 130 || September 3 || Reds || 3–2 || Lanning (10–8) || Riddle || — || 18,428 || 69–59
|- bgcolor="ccffcc"
| 131 || September 4 || Reds || 4–0 (5) || Sewell (13–14) || Walters || — || 1,720 || 70–59
|- bgcolor="ffbbbb"
| 132 || September 5 || Reds || 4–10 || Derringer || Butcher (15–11) || Beggs || — || 70–60
|- bgcolor="ccffcc"
| 133 || September 5 || Reds || 1–0 (7) || Dietz (6–1) || Starr || — || 4,897 || 71–60
|- bgcolor="ccffcc"
| 134 || September 6 || Cubs || 6–4 || Heintzelman (9–10) || Mooty || — || 3,040 || 72–60
|- bgcolor="ffbbbb"
| 135 || September 7 || Cubs || 1–3 || Eaves || Lanning (10–9) || — || 6,619 || 72–61
|- bgcolor="ffbbbb"
| 136 || September 9 || Giants || 2–4 (10) || Schumacher || Sewell (13–15) || — || 1,873 || 72–62
|- bgcolor="ccffcc"
| 137 || September 10 || Giants || 10–7 || Lanning (11–9) || Lohrman || Wilkie (2) || 1,076 || 73–62
|- bgcolor="ccffcc"
| 138 || September 11 || Braves || 7–5 || Heintzelman (10–10) || Hutchings || — || — || 74–62
|- bgcolor="ffbbbb"
| 139 || September 11 || Braves || 0–10 || Earley || Gee (0–1) || — || 2,320 || 74–63
|- bgcolor="ccffcc"
| 140 || September 12 || Braves || 6–3 || Dietz (7–1) || Johnson || — || — || 75–63
|- bgcolor="ffbbbb"
| 141 || September 12 || Braves || 0–5 || Javery || Lanning (11–10) || — || 2,083 || 75–64
|- bgcolor="ccffcc"
| 142 || September 13 || Braves || 1–0 || Strincevich (1–1) || Salvo || — || — || 76–64
|- bgcolor="ccffcc"
| 143 || September 14 || Phillies || 2–1 || Butcher (16–11) || Hoerst || — || — || 77–64
|- bgcolor="ffbbbb"
| 144 || September 14 || Phillies || 3–6 || Hughes || Sewell (13–16) || — || 7,495 || 77–65
|- bgcolor="ffbbbb"
| 145 || September 17 || Dodgers || 4–6 || Davis || Heintzelman (10–11) || Hamlin || 6,206 || 77–66
|- bgcolor="ccffcc"
| 146 || September 18 || Dodgers || 6–5 || Sewell (14–16) || Casey || — || 6,803 || 78–66
|- bgcolor="ffbbbb"
| 147 || September 20 || @ Reds || 1–2 || Walters || Butcher (16–12) || — || — || 78–67
|- bgcolor="ffbbbb"
| 148 || September 20 || @ Reds || 3–7 || Derringer || Strincevich (1–2) || — || 9,817 || 78–68
|- bgcolor="ffbbbb"
| 149 || September 21 || @ Reds || 0–2 || Riddle || Dietz (7–2) || — || 10,248 || 78–69
|- bgcolor="ccffcc"
| 150 || September 23 || Cardinals || 4–0 || Heintzelman (11–11) || Cooper || — || — || 79–69
|- bgcolor="ffbbbb"
| 151 || September 23 || Cardinals || 0–9 || Lanier || Sewell (14–17) || — || — || 79–70
|- bgcolor="ffbbbb"
| 152 || September 24 || Cardinals || 0–4 || Gumbert || Lanning (11–11) || — || — || 79–71
|- bgcolor="ccffcc"
| 153 || September 25 || Cardinals || 3–1 || Butcher (17–12) || White || — || — || 80–71
|- bgcolor="ffbbbb"
| 154 || September 26 || Reds || 3–4 || Vander Meer || Brandt (0–1) || — || 717 || 80–72
|- bgcolor="ffbbbb"
| 155 || September 27 || Reds || 9–15 || Riddle || Gee (0–2) || Beggs || 1,695 || 80–73
|- bgcolor="ccffcc"
| 156 || September 28 || Reds || 3–2 || Clemensen (1–0) || Walters || — || 4,137 || 81–73
|-

|-
| Legend:       = Win       = Loss       = TieBold = Pirates team member

Opening Day lineup

Roster

Player stats

Batting

Starters by position 
Note: Pos = Position; G = Games played; AB = At bats; H = Hits; Avg. = Batting average; HR = Home runs; RBI = Runs batted in

Other batters 
Note: G = Games played; AB = At bats; H = Hits; Avg. = Batting average; HR = Home runs; RBI = Runs batted in

Pitching

Starting pitchers 
Note: G = Games pitched; IP = Innings pitched; W = Wins; L = Losses; ERA = Earned run average; SO = Strikeouts

Other pitchers 
Note: G = Games pitched; IP = Innings pitched; W = Wins; L = Losses; ERA = Earned run average; SO = Strikeouts

Relief pitchers 
Note: G = Games pitched; W = Wins; L = Losses; SV = Saves; ERA = Earned run average; SO = Strikeouts

Awards and honors 
1941 Major League Baseball All-Star Game
Arky Vaughan, starter, SS
Bob Elliott, reserve
Al López, reserve

League top five finishers 
Vince DiMaggio
 #3 in NL in RBI (100)

Elbie Fletcher
 NL leader in on-base percentage (.421)

Rip Sewell
 NL leader in losses (17)

Farm system

LEAGUE CHAMPIONS: Harrisburg

Notes

References 
 1941 Pittsburgh Pirates at Baseball Reference
 1941 Pittsburgh Pirates at Baseball Almanac

Pittsburgh Pirates seasons
Pittsburgh Pirates season
Pittsburg Pir